Adega is a Portuguese restaurant in the Little Portugal neighborhood of San Jose, California. In 2016 it became the city's first restaurant to be awarded a Michelin star.

History
Adega (Portuguese for "wine cellar") opened in late 2015 as a cafe. It is located in the Little Portugal neighborhood of San Jose, and replaced Sousa's, also a Portuguese restaurant, which had occupied the building for 33 years. The owners are Carlos and Fernanda Carreira, who are wine importers and local residents; the chefs are their daughter Jessica Carreira, a patissier, and her husband David Costa, who met while working at Eleven, a two Michelin star restaurant in Lisbon. The restaurant serves traditional Portuguese food.

In September 2020, despite the COVID-19 pandemic, the Adega team announced that they would be opening a casual-dining restaurant in the SoFA District of downtown San Jose.

Michelin star
In October 2016 Adega was awarded a Michelin star, the first for a restaurant in San Jose and the second for a Portuguese restaurant in the US; Carreira, 23 years old, is also one of the youngest chefs to receive the award, and one of few women.

The restaurant retained its star in 2017 but lost it in 2018; it regained it in 2021.

References

Michelin Guide starred restaurants in California
Restaurants in San Jose, California
Companies based in San Jose, California
Portuguese cuisine
European restaurants in California